This is a list of video games developed or released by Sunsoft.

Video games

Cancelled

References

 
Sunsoft